Sphaeromorda is a genus of beetles in the family Mordellidae, containing the following species:

 Sphaeromorda abessinica Ermisch, 1968
 Sphaeromorda atterrima Ermisch, 1954
 Sphaeromorda caffra (Fahraeus, 1870)
 Sphaeromorda magnithorax Franciscolo, 1965
 Sphaeromorda natalensis Franciscolo, 1950
 Sphaeromorda nummata Pankow, 1974
 Sphaeromorda velutinoides Franciscolo, 1965

References

Mordellidae